Georgia State is a train station in Atlanta, Georgia, serving the Blue and Green lines of the Metropolitan Atlanta Rapid Transit Authority (MARTA) rail system.  The station is located within the James H. Floyd State Office Building in Downtown Atlanta and was constructed concurrently with the building in the late 1970s. Exits are located on Piedmont Avenue and Jesse Hill Jr. Drive (formerly Butler Street). The station's name is in reference to its proximity to Georgia State University.

The station provides access to Georgia State University and the Georgia State Capitol. Access is also provided to Grady Memorial Hospital, Children's Healthcare of Atlanta Hughes Spaulding, The Fulton County Health System, the Georgia Archives, James H. Floyd Twin Towers State buildings and Center Parc Stadium. Bus service is provided at this station to Lakewood Stadium, Piedmont Park, and Atlanta Medical Center.

Station layout

Buses at this station
The station is served by the following MARTA bus routes:
 Route 107 - Glenwood
 Route 813 - Atlanta Student Movement Boulevard
 Route 899 - Old Fourth Ward

References

External links

MARTA Station Page
nycsubway.org Atlanta page
 Jesse Hill Junior Drive entrance from Google Maps Street View
 Piedmont Avenue entrance from Google Maps Street View

Blue Line (MARTA)
Green Line (MARTA)
Metropolitan Atlanta Rapid Transit Authority stations
Railway stations in the United States opened in 1979
Railway stations in Atlanta
Railway stations in the United States at university and college campuses
1979 establishments in Georgia (U.S. state)